Urko Armas was a manufacturer of firearms and air gun that had its headquarters in the city of São Paulo, Brazil.

History 
It is not known exactly when it started producing weapons or if it had any relationship with the homonymous Spanish arms manufacturer Urko. In the records available on the Internet by the Brazilian Federal Revenue Service, its opening is in the year 1966.

It was very popular in the 1970s and 1980s for its low-cost guns, and well known for its 4.5mm caliber air rifles, .22 LR caliber bolt-action rifles and for its .38 Special caliber carbine which was used by the DOPS (Departamento de Ordem Politica e Social) of the Civil Police of the State of São Paulo in the 1970s and 1980s. His weapons were widely used by beginner shooters, civilians, private surveillance companies and cash transportation.

The guerrilla Carlos Lamarca, at the time a captain in the Brazilian Army, appeared in several photos in 1968 carrying an Urko .22 caliber LR rifle while giving shooting instruction to Bradesco bankers; at the time, he was providing training for bankers to defend themselves in case of robberies of the branches where they worked.

There is little information about this manufacturer, but it is known that it was taken as a cult by many shooters for a long time due to its low cost guns with non-standardized finishing, often leaving a lot to be desired in quality. 

It is believed that it was closed in the 2005, due to the increasing restrictions on firearms in Brazil. A few years later, its former owner founded Fiora Esportes, a air gun manufacturer also based in São Paulo.

Products

Air guns 
Tiger Pistol (in 4.5mm)
Modelo I, II and III carbines (in 4.5mm and 5.5mm)

Rifles 
Semi-automatic rifle (in .22LR and .38SPL)
Bolt action rifle (in .22LR and .38SPL)

References

Firearm manufacturers of Brazil
Manufacturing companies based in São Paulo
Defunct defence companies of Brazil
Manufacturing companies established in 1949
Ammunition manufacturers
1949 establishments in Brazil
Brazilian brands